Francesc Xavier 'Xavi' Roca Mateo (born 19 January 1974) is a Spanish retired footballer who played as a right-back.

Club career
Born in Barcelona, Catalonia, Roca joined FC Barcelona's academy at 16. He spent three professional seasons as captain of their reserves in the Segunda División, and his input with the first team consisted of 90 minutes in La Liga in a 2–2 away draw against Deportivo de La Coruña on 26 May 1996; additionally, for two consecutive years, he was loaned to CD Logroñés and CD Toledo in the second division.

Released in summer 1999, Roca remained in the second tier with Villarreal CF. He was first-choice in his first season as the club returned to the top flight after one year, then totalled 50 games over the next two as they managed to stay afloat.

Roca signed a two-year contract with top-division RCD Espanyol on 24 May 2002. He left after only one and two competitive appearances, returning to division two with Rayo Vallecano on a three-year deal.

Before retiring at the age of 36, Roca competed in the lower leagues and his native region, with CE L'Hospitalet, CE Sabadell FC and CE Europa. He also spent one year in the New Zealand Football Championship with Auckland City FC, where he suffered a serious knee injury in his debut.

Subsequently, Roca worked as sporting director at Sabadell, AEK Larnaca FC (Cypriot First Division) and Panathinaikos FC (Super League Greece).

References

External links

1974 births
Living people
Spanish footballers
Footballers from Barcelona
Association football defenders
La Liga players
Segunda División players
Segunda División B players
Tercera División players
FC Barcelona C players
FC Barcelona Atlètic players
FC Barcelona players
CD Logroñés footballers
CD Toledo players
Villarreal CF players
RCD Espanyol footballers
Rayo Vallecano players
CE L'Hospitalet players
CE Sabadell FC footballers
CE Europa footballers
New Zealand Football Championship players
Auckland City FC players
Spain youth international footballers
Spain under-21 international footballers
Spanish expatriate footballers
Expatriate association footballers in New Zealand
Spanish expatriate sportspeople in New Zealand
Spanish expatriate sportspeople in Cyprus
Spanish expatriate sportspeople in Greece